JGeeks are a New Zealand performance Maori comedy music group best known for their songs "Maori Boy" and "The Best Day I Ever Had", as well as their 2012 appearance as finalists in New Zealand's Got Talent. The group is led by former Disney Channel and C4 television presenter and Cleo Bachelor of the Year finalist, Jermaine Leef.

History 
In 2011, TV3 received NZ On Air funding to develop a comedy series titled J Geek vs the World, however this series was not produced. 

In 2012, the group entered New Zealand's Got Talent using the shortened name Jgeeks. They won the public vote in their semi-final, and eventually finished in fourth place in the grand final.

In September 2013, the group embarked on a 22-venue tour of New Zealand called the Eggs Factor tour. After playing their first eight shows, the tour was cancelled due to "circumstances outside of our control".

The Cuzzies 
The Cuzzies is a Metro-Maori electro craze group formed in 2011 and consists of the current members of JGeeks. They are best known for their 2011 single, "Ghost Chips".

Ghost Chips is a music video that parodies the anti-drink driving ad "Legend" that played on New Zealand television. Ghost Chips entered the NZ singles charts at number 11 in November. It received over 100,000 views in 4 days on YouTube. Former What Now presenter Tumehe Rongonui makes an appearance in it.

Discography

Albums

Singles

Other singles

References 

New Zealand comedy musical groups